Manik Sanyal (b. 1935 - d. 2017) was an Indian politician belonging to the Communist Party of India (Marxist). He was elected to the Lok Sabha, lower house of the Parliament of India, from Jalpaiguri in 1984 and 1989.

References

External links
  Official biographical sketch in Parliament of India website

1935 births
2017 deaths
Communist Party of India (Marxist) politicians from West Bengal
People from Jalpaiguri
India MPs 1984–1989
India MPs 1989–1991
Lok Sabha members from West Bengal